The 2012 Asian Baseball Championship was an international baseball competition held in Taichung, Taiwan from November 28 to December 2, 2012. It was the 26th edition of the tournament. Qualification did not begin until after the completion of the 2012 London Olympics.

Qualified Teams
 – Host and 2nd place of the 2009 Asian Baseball Championship
 – 4th place of the 2009 Asian Baseball Championship
 – 1st place of the 2009 Asian Baseball Championship
 – 1st place of the 2012 Asia Cup Baseball South West Division
 – 1st place of the 2012 Asia Cup Baseball South East Division
 – 3rd place of the 2009 Asian Baseball Championship

Results

Details

See also
 List of sporting events in Taiwan

External links
IBAF

References

Asian Baseball Championship
2012
2012 in Taiwanese sport
Asian Baseball Championship
Asian Baseball Championship
Sport in Taichung